Super Bowl XXIV was an American football game between the National Football Conference (NFC) champion San Francisco 49ers and the American Football Conference (AFC) champion Denver Broncos to decide the National Football League (NFL) champion for the 1989 season. The game was played on January 28, 1990, at the Louisiana Superdome in New Orleans, Louisiana. The 49ers defeated the Broncos by the score of 55–10, winning their second consecutive Super Bowl, and then-tying the Pittsburgh Steelers with four Super Bowl victories. San Francisco also became the first team to win back-to-back Super Bowls with two different head coaches; rookie head coach George Seifert took over after Bill Walsh retired following the previous season's Super Bowl.

The 49ers finished the 1989 regular season with a league best 14–2 record. The Broncos, who posted an 11–5 regular season record, entered the Super Bowl looking to avoid tying the Minnesota Vikings with four Super Bowl losses as well as the Vikings record of losing three Super Bowls in four years.

This game remains the most lopsided in Super Bowl history. San Francisco's 55 points were the most ever scored by one team, and their 45-point margin of victory is the largest ever. Also this set the record and is still the game with the largest difference in total offense yardage with 294 (San Francisco with 461 and Denver 167). The 49ers are also the only team to score at least eight touchdowns in a Super Bowl and at least two touchdowns in each quarter (the only mistake was a missed extra point attempt that occurred at the end of the first quarter).

San Francisco quarterback Joe Montana was named the Super Bowl MVP, his third award in his fourth Super Bowl victory. He completed 22 of 29 passes for a total of 297 yards and a Super Bowl record 5 touchdowns, while also rushing for 15 yards. Montana's 75.9 completion percentage was the second highest in Super Bowl history, and he also set a record by completing 13 consecutive passes during the game and broke two Super Bowl records set by Terry Bradshaw; most touchdown passes in a single game: 5 (breaking Bradshaw's record of 4) and most touchdown passes in Super Bowl play: 11 (breaking Bradshaw's record of 9). Montana became the third player in league history to win both the Super Bowl MVP and the AP Most Valuable Player Award during the same season, after Bart Starr and Terry Bradshaw who did so in the 1966 and 1978 seasons, respectively.

Background
NFL owners voted to award Super Bowl XXIV to New Orleans, Louisiana on March 14, 1985, during their March 10–15, 1985 meetings held in Phoenix. This would be a record seventh time that New Orleans hosted the Super Bowl. Tulane Stadium was the site of Super Bowls IV, VI, and IX; while the Louisiana Superdome previously hosted XII, XV, and XX.

Originally, the selection was to be voted on during the May 23–25, 1984 meetings. However, after balloting for XXI took more than two hours, voting for XXIV was rescheduled to the following year. Twelve cities were part of the bidding process, which was scheduled to award two Super Bowls (XXIII and XXIV). The bidding cities included: Anaheim, Detroit, Houston, Jacksonville, Miami, Minneapolis, New Orleans, Philadelphia, San Francisco, Seattle, Tampa, and Tempe. New Orleans entered as the favorite.

Teams

San Francisco 49ers

The 49ers entered the game seeking to win their second straight Super Bowl. Bill Walsh retired as head coach after San Francisco's 20–16 win over the Cincinnati Bengals in the previous year's Super Bowl, but rookie head coach George Seifert did not miss a beat, as he guided the 49ers to a league-best 14–2 regular season record.  Their two losses were only by a combined margin of 5 points.

The 49ers' offense was just as dominating as it was during the previous regular season. Quarterback Joe Montana threw for 3,512 yards, 26 touchdowns, and only 8 interceptions, giving him what was then the highest single-season quarterback rating in NFL history (112.4). Montana also rushed for 227 yards and 3 touchdowns, and earned both the NFL Most Valuable Player Award and the NFL Offensive Player of the Year Award. Wide receiver Jerry Rice had another outstanding season, catching 82 passes for 1,483 yards and 17 touchdowns.  Running back Roger Craig was the team's leading rusher with 1,054 yards and 6 touchdowns, and he recorded 49 receptions for 473 yards and another touchdown.

But other stars on the 49ers' offense began to emerge, enabling the team to spread the ball around. After being used primarily as a punt returner during his first two seasons, wide receiver John Taylor had a breakout season, catching 60 passes for 1,077 yards and 10 touchdowns, while also returning 36 punts for 417 yards.  Tight end Brent Jones recorded 40 receptions for 500 yards.  Fullback Tom Rathman had the best season of his career, rushing for 305 yards and catching 73 passes for 616 yards.  Kicker Mike Cofer scored 136 points while making a career-high 80.6% of his field goals. Even Montana's backup, Steve Young, had a great year, throwing for 1,001 yards and 8 touchdowns with only 3 interceptions, while also rushing for 126 yards and 2 touchdowns. With all of these weapons, San Francisco's offense led the league in total yards from scrimmage (6,268) and scoring (442 points).

The 49ers' defense allowed the third-fewest points in the NFL (253).  Defensive end Pierce Holt recorded 10.5 sacks, as did linebacker Charles Haley. In addition to Haley, their linebacking corps was anchored by Keena Turner, Matt Millen, and Bill Romanowski. Future Hall of Fame safety Ronnie Lott led the team with 5 interceptions. Defensive backs Eric Wright and Chet Brooks also combined for 5 interceptions between them.

Denver Broncos

The Broncos were trying to avoid becoming the second team, after the Vikings, to lose a fourth Super Bowl. After appearing in Super Bowl XXI and Super Bowl XXII, the team missed the playoffs with an 8–8 record during the 1988 season. But they signed several new players in the offseason to help them win 10 of their first 12 games in 1989 and finish with an 11–5 record.

One of Denver's new major additions was rookie running back Bobby Humphrey, who rushed for 1,151 yards, caught 22 passes for 156 yards, and scored 8 touchdowns. Humphrey gave the Broncos a powerful running attack that they lacked in their previous Super Bowl seasons.  Also new to the team was rookie kicker David Treadwell, who made the Pro Bowl with an 81.8% field goal percentage and ranked third in the NFL with 120 points. The defense, coordinated by Wade Phillips, had a new weapon as well: rookie free safety Steve Atwater. Together with veteran defensive backs Dennis Smith, Wymon Henderson, and Tyrone Braxton, the Broncos' secondary combined for 14 interceptions.  Braxton led the team with 6, which he returned for 103 yards and a touchdown, while also recovering 2 fumbles.  Linebacker Simon Fletcher lead the team with 105 tackles and 12 sacks, while veteran linebacker Karl Mecklenburg gained 7.5 sacks, 2 forced fumbles, and four fumble recoveries.  Another new addition was defensive end Ron Holmes, who recorded 9 sacks.  Defensive end Alphonso Carreker added 5.5 sacks.

Veteran receiver Vance Johnson had the best season of his career, catching 76 passes for 1,095 yards and 7 touchdowns, while also returning 12 punts for 118 yards. However, quarterback John Elway played inconsistently during the regular season, throwing just as many interceptions as touchdowns (18) and recording only a 73.7 passer rating.

Playoffs

Despite his regular season problems, Elway ended up playing his best during the playoffs. First, he led the Broncos on a late touchdown drive to narrowly defeat the Pittsburgh Steelers, 24–23. The Steelers held a 17–10 halftime lead before Elway's 37-yard touchdown pass to Vance Johnson tied the game in the third quarter. Then after Pittsburgh scored two field goals to take a 23–17 fourth-quarter lead, Elway led the Broncos on a 71-yard drive to score on Melvin Bratton's 1-yard, game-winning touchdown run. On the ensuing drive, Randy Robbins then recovered a Steelers fumble on third down with 2:02 left to clinch the victory.

The Broncos then defeated the Cleveland Browns 37–21 in the AFC Championship Game. This was the third time in the last four years that both teams faced each other for the AFC Championship, and the previous two resulted in two of the most famous games in NFL Lore: The Drive and The Fumble. In this game, the Broncos seemed to be in complete control at first, building up a 24–7 lead. But Browns quarterback Bernie Kosar rallied his team back with two third-quarter touchdowns, cutting the lead to 24–21 going into the 4th quarter.  Some observers began to wonder if this game would become known as "The Comeback".  However, Elway destroyed any chance of a Browns comeback by leading the Broncos 80 yards and scoring with a 39-yard touchdown pass to Sammy Winder on the first drive of the 4th quarter. Denver then scored field goals on each of their next two drives to put the game away.  Elway finished the game with 385 passing yards, 3 touchdowns, and no interceptions, while also leading Denver in rushing with 5 carries for 39 yards.

Meanwhile, the 49ers started out their postseason by blowing out the Minnesota Vikings, 41–13.  Minnesota started out the game by marching 70 yards on their opening drive and scoring a field goal to take a 3–0 lead.  But the 49ers dominated the rest of the game.  On their first play from scrimmage, Montana completed a short pass to Rice, who then took it all the way to the end zone for a 72-yard touchdown reception.  The next time they had the ball, Montana led them on another touchdown drive, scoring on a short pass to tight end Brent Jones.  Then defensive back Chet Brooks intercepted a pass from Vikings quarterback Wade Wilson and returned it 28 yards, setting up Montana's third touchdown pass on an 8-yard toss to Taylor.  Then just before halftime, Montana threw another touchdown pass to Rice, giving the 49ers a 28–3 halftime lead.  Then in the fourth quarter, San Francisco scored two more touchdowns to put the game away: a 53-yard interception return by Lott and a 4-yard run by Craig.  Montana finished the game with 241 passing yards, 4 touchdowns, and no interceptions. Wilson was held to just 9 completions for 74 yards, and was intercepted twice.

The 49ers then entered the NFC Championship Game against the Los Angeles Rams, who had defeated San Francisco in one of their two regular season games against them, and were coming off postseason wins against two of the NFC's toughest teams, the New York Giants and the Philadelphia Eagles.  The Rams scored first to take a 3–0 lead. However, the 49ers took over in the 2nd quarter, scoring 21 unanswered points on two touchdown passes by Montana and a touchdown run by Craig.  By halftime, San Francisco had a commanding 21–3 lead and went on to a surprisingly easy 30–3 win and their second consecutive Super Bowl appearance.  Montana had another superb performance, compiling 262 passing yards and 2 touchdowns, again without throwing an interception. Rams quarterback Jim Everett was held to 163 yards and threw 3 interceptions.

Super Bowl pregame news
Although Elway's performance in the AFC Championship Game was widely considered his best ever, many sports writers and fans believed that the Broncos' best effort would not be good enough to beat the 49ers. After all, Denver had barely defeated the Steelers, who only had a 9–7 regular season record, while the 9–6–1 Cleveland Browns had almost overcome a 17-point second half deficit before Denver put them away in the fourth quarter. Furthermore, the Elway-led Broncos had already lost two Super Bowls. On the other hand, the Montana-led 49ers, with their powerful offense, had already won three Super Bowls.

Montana came into this game with a 7–0 record as a starting quarterback at the Superdome due to the 49ers' dominance of their then-NFC West rival New Orleans Saints. The 49ers' only loss in the Superdome in the 1980s came in 1986, when Mike Moroski started for an injured Montana.

The Broncos, as the designated home team in the annual rotation between AFC and NFC teams, wore their home orange uniforms with white pants. At the time, the Broncos were winless (0–2) in Super Bowls while wearing orange. The 49ers would wear white road uniforms with gold pants, which was the same combination they wore in their Super Bowl XVI victory.

Broadcasting
The game was broadcast in the United States by CBS and featured the broadcast team of play-by-play announcer Pat Summerall and color commentator John Madden. Brent Musburger hosted all of The Super Bowl Today pregame (2 hours), halftime, and postgame events with help from his NFL Today co-hosts Irv Cross, Dick Butkus, and Will McDonough, along with game analysts Terry Bradshaw, Ken Stabler, and Dan Fouts, and then-Chicago Bears head coach Mike Ditka. CBS Sports reporter Pat O'Brien, meanwhile, was stationed in San Francisco 49ers quarterback Joe Montana's hometown of Monongahela, Pennsylvania.

This was the last NFL broadcast for the NFL Today team as it was constructed. Several weeks after the Super Bowl, a management change at CBS resulted in the firing of Brent Musburger; his last event for the network was the call of the 1990 NCAA Men's Basketball Championship Game on April 2. Irv Cross was taken off the studio team and became an analyst instead, serving that role for two years with Tim Ryan. Dick Butkus returned to acting, while Will McDonough moved over to NBC’s pregame, where he would remain until retiring. CBS went to a two-man studio team for 1990 with Greg Gumbel, who joined CBS from ESPN the prior year, replacing Musburger as host and Terry Bradshaw moving from his prior position as the No. 2 analyst alongside Verne Lundquist to the studio analyst position vacated by Cross. CBS would not return to using a four-man studio team until 1998, coinciding with their return to broadcasting NFL games for the first time since 1993.

CBS also debuted a new graphical package and theme song for their telecasts. The graphics became part of The NFL Today open while the theme continued to be used on game broadcasts for the next two seasons and replaced the original NFL Today theme ("Horizontal Hold" by Jack Trombey), which had been used in remixed form for the 1989 season. The last use of the actual theme was for the 1991 season's NFC Championship Game, while a remixed version was used for Super Bowl XXVI's pregame show.

The game drew a national Nielsen rating of 39.0 for CBS, the lowest rating for a Super Bowl game since Super Bowl III in January 1969.

This game was featured on NFL's Greatest Games under the title Coronation.

This Super Bowl was simulcast in Canada on CTV and in Mexico on Imevisión's Canal 13, and later aired in the United Kingdom on Channel 4.

This was the last Super Bowl to feature a kickoff time earlier than 6 p.m. ET.

Nissan aired a commercial during Super Bowl XXIV advertising the new Nissan 300ZX Twin Turbo. Executives at Nissan pulled the commercial after the initial airing when they became concerned the commercial would promote street racing since the commercial features the 300ZX being faster than a sport bike, a formula one car and a fighter jet.

Grand Slam was broadcast after the game on CBS.

On radio, the game was broadcast in the United States by CBS and featured the broadcast team of play-by-play announcer Jack Buck and color commentators Hank Stram and Randy Cross. Cross filled in for Stram when the latter was stricken with laryngitis and had to leave the broadcast in the third quarter of the game. Dick Stockton hosted all of the events. Locally, Super Bowl XXIV was broadcast by KGO-AM in San Francisco with Joe Starkey and Wayne Walker and by KOA-AM in Denver with Larry Zimmer and Jim Turner (Zimmer was moved from his normal position as a color commentator when the Broncos' regular play-by-play voice, Bob Martin, became seriously ill the day before the game; eventually losing his battle with cancer just under a month after the game).

Entertainment

Pregame ceremonies
The pregame show was a salute to Mardi Gras and featured musician and singer David Clayton-Thomas.

Soul and R&B singer (and New Orleans native) Aaron Neville later sang the national anthem.

The coin toss ceremony featured the recent inductees to the Pro Football Hall of Fame: defensive back Mel Blount, quarterback Terry Bradshaw, offensive lineman Art Shell, and safety Willie Wood.  Shell, who was then the head coach of the Los Angeles Raiders, became the first active head coach or player to join the coin toss ceremonies.  Bradshaw, not to be outdone, joined the ceremonies on the occasion of the 15th anniversary of Super Bowl IX, which had been played at Tulane Stadium and saw the Pittsburgh Steelers win their first world championship.

Halftime show
The halftime show was a salute to both New Orleans and the 40th anniversary of the comic strip Peanuts. The show featured performances by clarinetist Pete Fountain, fiddle player Doug Kershaw, and singer Irma Thomas – all Louisiana natives. Three local college bands, Southern University, ULL, and Nicholls State, joined in the performance. The finale featured a float that was dressed up as a riverboat that rose several stories high. The float was so huge that one of the goal posts had to be moved so it could be put on the field.

Game summary

The 49ers blew out the Broncos by gaining 461 yards of total offense, holding the ball for 39:31, and scoring on eight of their first 11 drives. The San Francisco defense also limited the Broncos to 167 yards, 12 first downs, and 20:29 time of possession, while recording six sacks and forcing four turnovers. The 49ers converted all of the turnovers into touchdowns, needing only four plays total to score on the last three.

First quarter
On their opening possession, the Broncos were forced to punt after three plays, and the 49ers scored on their ensuing drive, marching 66 yards in 10 plays and scoring on a 20-yard touchdown pass from quarterback Joe Montana to wide receiver Jerry Rice.

The Broncos responded with a 49-yard scoring drive, mainly on plays by running back Bobby Humphrey, who rushed 4 times for 22 yards and caught a 27-yard shovel pass, quarterback John Elway's longest completion of the game. Kicker David Treadwell finished the drive with a 42-yard field goal to cut the Broncos' deficit to 7–3.

Denver's defense forced San Francisco to punt on their next drive after three plays, and wide receiver Vance Johnson gave his team good field position with a 7-yard return to the Broncos' 49-yard line. But then Humphrey lost a fumble at midfield while being tackled by defensive end Kevin Fagan, and safety Chet Brooks recovered the loose ball for San Francisco at the 49ers' 46-yard line.

At this point, the 49ers completely took over the game. Ten plays after the fumble recovery, the 49ers scored on a 7-yard pass from Montana to tight end Brent Jones. Kicker Mike Cofer missed the extra point attempt wide right, keeping the score at 13–3, but it turned out to be the only miscue the 49ers would make for the rest of the game.

Second quarter
Once again, the Broncos were forced to punt three plays after the ensuing kickoff, and the 49ers advanced 69 yards in 14 plays to score another touchdown.  The key player on that drive was fullback Tom Rathman, who caught 3 passes for 39 yards, kept the drive alive with a successful run on a fourth down, and capped it off with a 1-yard touchdown run to make the score 20–3.  With under two minutes left in the first half, wide receiver John Taylor's 17-yard punt return gave the 49ers the ball near midfield. Just over a minute later, San Francisco scored another touchdown with a 38-yard completion from Montana to Rice, increasing their lead to 27–3 at the end of the half.

Third quarter
When the second half started, the 49ers picked up right where they left off.  Linebacker Michael Walter intercepted Elway's first pass of the third quarter, and Montana threw a 28-yard touchdown pass to Rice on the next play. It was Montana's 10th Super Bowl touchdown pass breaking the previous record of 9 set by Terry Bradshaw. Then Elway was intercepted again on the Broncos' ensuing drive, this time by Brooks, who returned the ball 38 yards to the Denver 37-yard line. Two plays later, Montana fooled defensive back Steve Atwater with a pump fake in Rice's direction, and then threw a 35-yard touchdown pass to Taylor (his 5th and final touchdown of the game and his 11th and final touchdown pass of his Super Bowl career), making the score 41–3 before the quarter was 6 minutes old. San Francisco had scored 3 touchdowns in less than 6 minutes to blow open the game.

Denver's lone touchdown came on their next possession, a 61-yard, 5-play drive. First, Broncos defensive back Darren Carrington returned the ensuing kickoff 39 yards to the 39-yard line. Elway's 13-yard completion to Johnson, a 34-yard run from Humphrey, and a pass interference penalty on 49ers linebacker Bill Romanowski moved the ball to the San Francisco 1-yard line. Elway then capped off the drive with a 3-yard touchdown run on third down, cutting their deficit to 41–10.

Fourth quarter
However, the 49ers continued to dominate the Broncos. San Francisco responded to Denver's score with an 11-play, 75-yard drive that took 6:56 off the clock, and ended with Rathman's 3-yard touchdown run on the first play of the fourth quarter.  Then after the ensuing kickoff, Elway was sacked for a 6-yard loss by defensive end Danny Stubbs.  Then after an offsides penalty on the 49ers, cornerback Don Griffin sacked Elway, forcing a fumble.  Stubbs recovered the loose ball and returned it 15 yards to Denver's 1-yard line. 49ers running back Roger Craig then closed out the scoring with a 1-yard touchdown run on the next play to make the final score of the game 55–10. The 49ers had two scores in this quarter before two minutes had elapsed. Steve Young relieved Montana for the remainder of the game.

Rice finished the game with 7 receptions for 148 yards and a Super Bowl record 3 receiving touchdowns. He joined teammate Roger Craig as the only players to score three touchdowns in a Super Bowl (Craig did it in Super Bowl XIX – 2 receiving and 1 rushing). Craig was the leading rusher of the game with 69 rushing yards and a touchdown, while also catching 5 passes for 34 yards. Rathman rushed for 38 yards and 2 touchdowns while also catching 4 passes for 43 yards. Taylor caught 3 passes for 49 yards and a touchdown and added another 38 yards on 3 punt returns. Elway was held to a passer rating of 19.4 on just 10 completions out of 26 attempts for 108 yards with no touchdowns and 2 interceptions. He managed to run for a touchdown, but fumbled twice (although he recovered one of them). Humphrey was Denver's leading rusher and receiver, with 61 rushing yards and 3 receptions for 38 yards. Carrington returned 6 kickoffs for 146 yards.

A photo essay titled "Ranking the Super Bowls", written by media analyst Elliot Harrison and featuring Dallas personnel man Gil Brandt, ranked Super Bowl XXIV the lowest of the first 50 played. The article was published on the NFL's website.

Box score

Aftermath
Montana and the 49ers looked to win a third consecutive Super Bowl in 1990 and once again finished with the league's best record at 14–2. However, in the NFC Championship Game that season, the 49ers were defeated by the New York Giants on a field goal as time expired. During the game, Montana was sacked from his blind side by Leonard Marshall and was forced to leave the game with a series of injuries including a broken finger, a bruised back, and a concussion. Later, it was discovered that Montana suffered an injury to his throwing elbow in the game and it was severe enough to cost him the entire 1991 season. Montana's injuries, which kept him out of fifteen games in 1992 as well, paved the way for Steve Young to become the 49ers' starting quarterback full-time and Montana was eventually traded to the Kansas City Chiefs in 1993. Young would win the 49ers another Super Bowl title in 1995 in Super Bowl XXIX.

After Super Bowl XXIV, Elway and the Broncos entered a period of decline. 1990 saw them fall to 5–11, which put them last in the AFC West. While they returned to the playoffs in 1991, the Broncos failed to make the Super Bowl after losing the AFC Championship Game to the Buffalo Bills. That marked the first time in their existence that Denver lost a conference championship game. They eventually returned to success as Elway led the team to an NFL-best 13–3 record in 1996, only to lose their first playoff game, against the Jacksonville Jaguars. Incidentally, that was the final time in Elway's career that he would lose a playoff game. After his three previous attempts had gone unsuccessfully, Elway led the Broncos to Super Bowl XXXII where they finally broke through and won the Super Bowl for the first time in franchise history, over the Green Bay Packers. A year later, in what later proved to be the final game of his career, Elway led the Broncos to another victory in the Super Bowl as Denver won Super Bowl XXXIII 34–19 over the Atlanta Falcons.

Final statistics
Sources: NFL.com Super Bowl XXIV, Super Bowl XXIV Play Finder SF, Super Bowl XXIV Play Finder Den

Statistical comparison

Individual statistics

1Completions/attempts
2Carries
3Long gain
4Receptions
5Times targeted

Records set
The following records were set in Super Bowl XXIV, according to the official NFL.com boxscore, the 2022 NFL Record & Fact Book and the ProFootball reference.com game summary. Some records have to meet NFL minimum number of attempts to be recognized. The minimums are shown (in parentheses).

Turnovers are defined as the number of times losing the ball on interceptions and fumbles.

Starting lineups
Source:

Officials
 Referee: Dick Jorgensen #60 first Super Bowl; alternate for XV
 Umpire: Hendi Ancich #115 alternate for XXI
 Head Linesman: Earnie Frantz #111 first Super Bowl
 Line Judge: Ron Blum #83 first Super Bowl
 Back Judge: Al Jury #106 third Super Bowl (XX, XXII)
 Side Judge: Gerald Austin #34 first Super Bowl
 Field Judge: Don Orr #77 second Super Bowl (XVII)
 Alternate Referee: Dick Hantak #105 worked Super Bowl XVII as back judge
 Alternate Umpire: Rex Stuart #103
 This would be the final game for Jorgensen, who died from cancer on October 10, 1990. Austin was promoted to fill his vacant referee position.

References

External links
 Super Bowl official website
 
 
 
 Super Bowl XXIV at Pro-Football Reference
 Super Bowl play-by-plays from USA Today (Last accessed September 28, 2005)

1989 National Football League season
San Francisco 49ers postseason
Denver Broncos postseason
Super Bowl
1990 in American football
American football competitions in New Orleans
1990 in sports in Louisiana
January 1990 sports events in the United States
1990s in New Orleans